Makinson may refer to:

People
Carolyn Makinson, American demographer
David Makinson (born 1941), Australian logician
David Makinson (cricketer) (born 1961), English cricketer
Jessica Makinson, American actress and comedian
John Makinson, British businessman
Joseph Makinson (born 1836), English cricketer
Rachel Makinson, Australian scientist
Richard Makinson (1913–1979), Australian physicist
Robert Owen Makinson (born 1956), Australian botanist
Thomas Makinson (born 1991), English rugby league player

Places
Makinson Inlet, Nunavut, Canada
Makinson Island, Florida, U.S.